Rien is a lake in the municipality of Røros in Trøndelag county, Norway. The water flows out through the river Glomma and heads a short distance south, into the large lake Aursunden.

See also
List of lakes in Norway

References

Røros
Lakes of Trøndelag